Leyb Moiseyevich Kvitko (October 15, 1890 – August 12, 1952) was a prominent Yiddish poet, an author of well-known children's poems and a member of the Jewish Anti-Fascist Committee (JAC). He was one of the editors of Eynikayt (the JAC's newspaper) and of the Heymland, a literary magazine. He was executed in Moscow on August 12, 1952 together with twelve other members of the JAC, a massacre known as the Night of the Murdered Poets. Kvitko was rehabilitated in 1955.

He was born in a Ukrainian shtetl, attended traditional Jewish religious school for boys (cheder) and was orphaned early. He moved to Kyiv in 1917 and soon became one of the leading Yiddish poets of the "Kiev Group". He lived in Germany between 1921 and 1925 joining there the Communist Party of Germany and publishing critically acclaimed poetry. He returned to the Soviet Union in 1925 and moved to Moscow in 1936, joining the CPSU in 1939. By that time he was primarily writing verses for children and his style fully corresponded to the canons of socialist realism.

Gallery

References

External links

 
The Jewish Poet, Lev Kvitko 
Selected poetry of Jewish poet Lev Knitrko 
Life would have been magnificent, contains Kvitko's letters to friends, in Almanac "Yegupets", No 9, Kiev 

1890 births
1952 deaths
20th-century male writers
20th-century Ukrainian poets
20th-century Ukrainian writers
People from Podolia Governorate
Communist Party of the Soviet Union members
Recipients of the Order of the Red Banner of Labour
Children's poets
Executed writers
Yiddish-language poets
Jewish anti-fascists
Jewish socialists
Jewish Ukrainian poets
Jews executed by the Soviet Union
Jews from the Russian Empire
Soviet children's writers
Soviet Jews
Soviet male poets
Soviet male writers
Soviet rehabilitations
Ukrainian anti-fascists
Ukrainian children's writers
Ukrainian Jews
Ukrainian male poets
Ukrainian male writers